J. W. Moore House is a historic home located at Rhinebeck, Dutchess County, New York. It was built about 1850 and is a -story, cruciform-plan building with board-and-batten siding and a cross-gable roof, built into a hillside and features a number of eclectic-Picturesque design elements.  Also on the property is a contributing barn, carriage house, and well with well house.

It was added to the National Register of Historic Places in 1987.

References

Houses on the National Register of Historic Places in New York (state)
Houses completed in 1850
Houses in Rhinebeck, New York
National Register of Historic Places in Dutchess County, New York